Rossioglossum is a genus of flowering plants from the orchid family, Orchidaceae. It has 9 currently recognized species (as of May 2014), all native to Mexico, Central America, and northern and western South America.

Rossioglossum ampliatum (Lindl.) M.W.Chase & N.H.Williams - from Guatemala to Venezuela and Peru
Rossioglossum grande (Lindl.) Garay & G.C.Kenn. - Chiapas, Guatemala, El Salvador, Costa Rica
Rossioglossum hagsaterianum Soto Arenas - Nayarit, Jalisco
Rossioglossum insleayi (Baker ex Lindl.) Garay & G.C.Kenn. -  from Jalisco to Oaxaca
Rossioglossum krameri (Rchb.f.) M.W.Chase & N.H.Williams - Nicaragua, Costa Rica, Panama
Rossioglossum oerstedii (Rchb.f.) M.W.Chase & N.H.Williams - Costa Rica, Panama
Rossioglossum schlieperianum (Rchb.f.) Garay & G.C.Kenn. - Guatemala, El Salvador, Costa Rica, Panama
Rossioglossum splendens (Rchb.f.) Garay & G.C.Kenn. - Oaxaca
Rossioglossum williamsianum (Rchb.f.) Garay & G.C.Kenn - Chiapas, Guatemala, Honduras

See also 
 List of Orchidaceae genera

References 

  (1976) The genus Rossioglossum. Orchid Digest 40 (4): 139.
  2005. Handbuch der Orchideen-Namen. Dictionary of Orchid Names. Dizionario dei nomi delle orchidee. Ulmer, Stuttgart
  (2009) Epidendroideae (Part two). Genera Orchidacearum 5: 347 ff. Oxford University Press.

External links 

Oncidiinae genera
Oncidiinae
Taxa named by Rudolf Schlechter